The 2007 Currie Cup First Division was contested from 22 June to 6 October 2007. The tournament (also known as the Absa Currie Cup First Division for sponsorship reasons) is the second tier of South Africa's premier domestic rugby union competition, featuring teams representing either entire provinces or substantial regions within provinces.

Competition

Regular season and title playoffs

There were six participating teams in the 2007 Currie Cup First Division. These teams played each other twice over the course of the season, once at home and once away.

Teams received four points for a win and two points for a draw. Bonus points were awarded to teams that scored 4 or more tries in a game, as well as to teams losing a match by 7 points or less. Teams were ranked by points, then points difference (points scored less points conceded).

The top 4 teams qualified for the title play-offs. In the semifinals, the team that finished first had home advantage against the team that finished fourth, while the team that finished second had home advantage against the team that finished third. The winners of these semi-finals played each other in the final, at the home venue of the higher-placed team.

Promotion playoffs

The top two teams on the log also qualified for the promotion/relegation play-offs. The team that finished first played off against the team placed eighth in the 2007 Currie Cup Premier Division and the team that finished second played off against the team that finished seventh in the Premier Division. The two winners over these two ties (determined via team tables, with all Currie Cup ranking regulations in effect) qualified for the 2008 Currie Cup Premier Division, while the losing teams qualified for the 2008 Currie Cup First Division.

Teams

Log

Final standings

Round-by-round

Results

The results of all the matches played in the 2007 Currie Cup First Division were as follows:

All times are South African (GMT+2).

Round one

Round two

Round three

Round four

Round Five

Round Six

Round Seven

Round Eight

Round Nine

Round Ten

Round Eleven

Round Twelve

Semi-finals

Final

Players

Player Statistics

The following table contain points which have been scored in the 2007 Currie Cup First Division.

Squad Lists

See also

 2007 Currie Cup Premier Division
 2007 Vodacom Cup

References

2007
2007 Currie Cup